Bandera Creek is a stream in Bandera County, Texas, in the United States. It rises in Bandera Pass, 2½ miles south of Camp Verde in northeastern Bandera County (at 29°51' N, 99°06' W), and flows south for thirteen miles to its mouth on the Medina River, a mile east of Bandera (at 29°44' N, 99°03' W).

Bandera Creek took its name from Bandera Pass.

See also
List of rivers of Texas

References

Rivers of Bandera County, Texas
Rivers of Texas